Pizza, a staple of Italian cuisine, has become one of the most recognizable and popular dishes worldwide. Its widespread adoption into other cuisines, replacing the local traditional dishes, is traced to the early 20th century.

Europe

Italy

Authentic Neapolitan pizzas (pizza napoletana) are typically made with tomatoes and mozzarella cheese. They can be made with ingredients like San Marzano tomatoes, which grow on the volcanic plains to the south of Mount Vesuvius, and mozzarella di bufala Campana, made with the milk from water buffalo raised in the marshlands of Campania and Lazio in a semi-wild state (this mozzarella is protected with its own European protected designation of origin).

According to the rules proposed by the Associazione Verace Pizza Napoletana, the genuine Neapolitan pizza dough consists of wheat flour (type 0 or 00, or a mixture of both), natural Neapolitan yeast or brewer's yeast, salt and water. For proper results, strong flour with high protein content (as used for bread-making rather than cakes) must be used. The dough must be kneaded by hand or with a low-speed mixer. The pizza must be baked for 60–90 seconds in a  stone oven with an oak-wood fire. When cooked, it should be crispy, tender and fragrant. There are three official variants: pizza marinara, which is made with tomato, garlic, oregano and extra-virgin olive oil, pizza Margherita, made with tomato, sliced mozzarella, basil and extra-virgin olive oil, and pizza Margherita di bufala made with tomato, sliced buffalo mozzarella from Campania, basil and extra-virgin olive oil. The pizza napoletana is a Traditional Speciality Guaranteed (Specialità Tradizionale Garantita, STG) product in Europe.

Roman pizza, pizza in Lazio (Rome), as well as in many other parts of Italy, is available in two different styles. Take-away shops sell pizza rustica or pizza al taglio. This pizza is cooked in long, rectangular baking pans and relatively thick (1–2 cm). The pizza is often cooked in an electric oven. It is usually cut with scissors or a knife and sold by weight. In pizzerias, pizza is served in a dish in its traditional round shape. It has a thin, crisp base quite different from the thicker and softer Neapolitan-style base. It is usually cooked in a wood-fired oven, giving the pizza its unique flavor and texture. In Rome, a pizza napoletana is topped with tomato, mozzarella, anchovies and oil (thus, what in Naples is called pizza romana, in Rome is called pizza napoletana). Other types of Lazio-style pizza include:
 pizza romana (tomato, mozzarella, anchovies, oregano, oil)
 pizza viennese (tomato, mozzarella, German sausage, oregano, oil)
 pizza capricciosa (mozzarella, tomato, mushrooms, artichokes, cooked ham, olives, oil)
 pizza quattro formaggi ("four cheese pizza": tomatoes, and the cheeses mozzarella, stracchino, fontina and gorgonzola; sometimes ricotta is swapped for one of the latter three)
 pizza bianca ("white pizza": a type of bread topped with olive oil, salt and, occasionally herbs, such as rosemary sprigs) 
 pizza e fichi (pizza with figs)
 pizza casalinga ("home-style pizza"): a thin layer of dough which is stretched into an oiled, square "Sicilian" pan, topped sparingly with shredded mozzarella, crushed uncooked canned tomatoes, chopped garlic and olive oil, and baked until the top bubbles and the bottom is crisp.

Pizza quattro stagioni is a popular style prepared with various ingredients in four sections, with each section representing a season of the year.

Pizza pugliese is prepared with tomato, mozzarella and onion.

Pizzetta is a small pizza that can range in size from around three inches in diameter to the size of a small personal-sized pizza. It may be served as an hors d'oeuvre.

Sicilian pizza is prepared in a manner originating in Sicily, Italy. Just in the US, the phrase Sicilian pizza is often synonymous with thick-crust or deep-dish pizza derived from the Sicilian Sfincione. In Sicily, there is a variety of pizza called Sfincione. It is believed that Sicilian pizza, Sfincione, or focaccia with toppings, was popular on the western portion of the island as far back as the 1860s.

Pisan pizza (pizza pisana) is a smaller and thicker pizza baked into metal plates and traditionally served with anchovies, capers and grated Grana Padano cheese. The slices are traditionally served folded with a slice of cecina, a chickpeas cake, as street food in Pisa, its province and the nearby provinces of Livorno and Lucca.

Legislation for traditional Italian pizza
There was a bill before the Italian Parliament in 2002 to safeguard the traditional Italian pizza, specifying permissible ingredients and methods of processing (e.g., excluding frozen pizzas). Only pizzas which followed these guidelines could be called "traditional Italian pizzas" in Italy. On 9 December 2009, the European Union, upon Italian request, granted Traditional Speciality Guaranteed (TSG) safeguard to traditional Neapolitan pizza, in particular to "Margherita" and "Marinara". The European Union enacted a protected designation of origin system in the 1990s.

Hungary
Hungarians enjoy most of the traditional pizza toppings, but there are some unique local varieties, including "Magyaros" ("Hungarian-style") pizza, which usually has toppings like bacon, kolbász (Hungarian sausage), salami, hot peppers, and red onion. "White pizza" (see below) is also popular, especially because it's similar to Hungarian kenyérlángos or langalló (a type of flatbread often topped with sour cream, bacon and onions).

Pizza Hut opened its first restaurant in Hungary in 1992. Local pizza chains include Don Pepe, Pizza Forte, Il Treno, and Pizza King.

Iceland
While Iceland has many traditional American and Italian style pizza toppings, bananas are a common topping in both Iceland and Sweden.

Malta
The Maltese enjoy eating Italian style pizza and fast-food pizzas, including local produce. One style of fast-food pizza is the typical pizza kwadra (square pizza), which is found in Pastizzi shops (pastizzeriji), a deep-pan pizza cut into squares, generally topped with either green olives (taż-żebbuġ), hard boiled egg and cocktail sausage (bajd u zalzett), or chicken and barbecue sauce (tat-tiġieġ). A typical Pizzerija will offer a vast number of different pizza recipes, mostly based on local taste. A typical menu would Margherita, Capricciosa, Quattro Stagioni and other typical pizzas.

Pizza has become a household dish. Nevertheless, the traditional Maltese pizza consists of a typical Maltese ftira covered in cheese (mainly local gbejna), onions and potatoes. In fact, it is most often known simply as "ftira" and is mainly sold on the island of Gozo. Different toppings can be added, including tuna, olives, anchovies, sundried tomatoes, and even traditional Maltese sausage.

Norway
Norwegians eat the most pizza in the world according to a 2004 survey by ACNielsen 2004, 5.4 kg/year per capita. 50 million frozen pizzas were sold that year, with consumption being 22,000 tons of frozen pizza, 15,000 tons of home-baked and 13,000 tons of restaurant-made pizzas. By far the most popular is the frozen pizza brand Grandiosa; of all the pizzas frozen or fresh sold in Norway, every other pizza sold is a Pizza Grandiosa. Since its start in 1980 the Grandiosa has been part of Norwegian modern culture and trends, going so far to be unofficially called "The national dish of Norway".

Poland
According to thefirstnews.com, "...most ordered pizza in Poland is the capricciosa, while the favourite toppings in Poland are ham, salami, mushrooms, onions and bacon. Garlic dipping sauce is the favourite choice to accompany a pizza is with 68 percent choosing this and tomato sauce in second place with 14 percent."

Russia
Pizza has only been known in Russia since the end of the 20th century. At the turn of the millennium, the first original Italian pizzerias opened in Russia. After that, pizza became a cult phenomenon. In Russia, high-class ingredients are often used as a topping. For example, the pizza is topped with caviar, salmon, beef fillets or truffles.

Sweden

The first pizza to be served in Sweden was in 1947 at the ASEA staff canteen in Västerås but it was not until 1968 that it became available to the general public at the Stockholm restaurant Östergök. Pizzerias soon followed, run at first by Italian guest workers and subsequently by migrant Turks, which added an unmistakable hint of the Levant to the Swedish pizza. Swedish pizzas are thicker than the Neapolitan, with a more spiced sauce, and without the characteristic crisp texture, but make use of the traditional toppings, and most pizzerias in Sweden have Margherita, Capricciosa, and Quattro Stagioni pizzas at the top of the menu, although with altered recipes. For example, a Swedish Margherita uses Swedish hard cheese instead of mozzarella and dried oregano instead of fresh basil.

Some popular varieties common in most of Sweden, mostly with the same name, all having tomato sauce and cheese to start with and additional toppings:
 Africana: ham/beef/chicken, banana, pineapple, onion, curry powder
 Bolognese: minced meat, onion, (fresh tomato)
 Calzone (folded): ham
 Capricciosa: mushrooms, ham
 Ciao-ciao (folded): beef, garlic, (onion)
 Frutti di mare: tuna, shrimp, mussels
 Hawaii: ham, pineapple
 Kebabpizza: döner kebab, onion, green peperoncini, (kebab sauce poured over after baking)
 Marinara: shrimp, mussels
 Mexicana: various recipes with minced beef, jalapeños, onion, spicy sauce and other spicy ingredients
 Napolitana: anchovies, olives, capers
 Quattro Stagioni: ham, shrimp, (mussels), mushrooms, artichoke
 Vegetariana: mushrooms, onion, (pineapple), (artichokes), (asparagus), (red bell pepper)
 other varieties with filet of beef or pork and béarnaise sauce and onion

Perhaps the most extreme pizza in Sweden is the Calskrove or Calzskrove (a portmanteau of calzone and "skrovmål" meaning "big meal" but also Northern slang for "hamburger meal"), sold at some pizzerias in northern Sweden, a complete meal of a 150 or 250 grams of hamburger with bread, all regular toppings, and chips (french fries), baked into a regular Calzone with ham as well.

One of the most popular types of pizza in Sweden since the 1980s is kebab pizza, and a song in the Swedish Melodifestivalen 2008 was "Kebabpizza slivovitza".

Ukraine
Since the end of the 1980s, a wide variety of pizzas has been available. In Ukraine there are few local kinds of pizza like Kozatska and Selyanska. Pizza Margherita and other common varieties are also very popular.

United Kingdom and Ireland
Since the 1980s, a wide variety of pizzas ranging from fairly authentic Italian to American style to the mass-processed varieties has been widely available, and pizzas are also commonly made at home using local substitutions such as bacon for prosciutto and cheddar for mozzarella. Dough bases vary widely from homemade doughs to thin Roman-style and thick American stuffed-crust types. The typical British high street now has a variety of restaurants belonging to international Italian- and American-style pizza chains, including homegrown chains PizzaExpress, Strada, and Prezzo as well as Domino's, Pizza Hut, and Papa John's alongside more authentic, independent, sometimes Italian-run restaurants with wood-fired ovens. Unique spicy varieties enjoy some popularity, including Chicken tikka masala or other curry toppings, chili pizzas, and a typical mid-range restaurant or takeaway will usually have versions of such standard "Italian-American" combinations as 'Hawaiian' (ham and pineapple), 'Pepperoni' (spicy salami), 'Meat Feast' (a mix of meats and salami), and 'Vegeteriana' options. Non-Italian varieties can be found too, particularly in larger cities such as London, for example, lahmacun called 'Turkish pizzas', or Alsatian 'Flammkuchen'. In some parts of Scotland, a deep-fried pizza called a 'pizza crunch' is sold from Fish and Chip shops. A frozen pizza, whole or half,  is dipped in batter and deep fried, and usually served in the same manner as any other fried item from these shops.

Asia

South and East Asia

China
The presence of pizza restaurant chains in China has contributed to a significant increase in pizza consumption in the country. Pizza Hut opened its first store in China in 1990, and Pizza Hut and Domino's Pizza both expanded in the Chinese market in the 2000s. In order to fit with China's market demand and national culinary peculiarities Pizza Hut modified its pizza recipes to include local ingredients, such as crab sticks, tuna, soy sauce and corn. As of 2019, Pizza Hut had over 2,000 outlets in China.

India

Pizza is an emerging fast food in India. Domestic pizza brands include U.S. Pizza, Smokin' Joes and Pizza Corner. Branded pizza is available in most cities in India. India is the largest market for Domino's Pizza outside the US. Pizza brands feature greater "recipe localization" from pizza makers than many other markets such as Latin America and Europe, but similar to other Asian pizza markets. Indian pizzas are generally spicier and more vegetable-oriented than those in other countries. For instance, oregano spice packs are included with a typical pizza order in India instead of Parmesan cheese. In addition to spicier and more vegetable-oriented ingredients, Indian pizza also utilizes unique toppings like pickled ginger.

Pizza outlets serve pizzas with several Indian-style toppings, such as tandoori chicken and paneer. More conventional pizzas are also eaten. Pizzas available in India range from localized basic variants, available in neighborhood bakeries, to gourmet pizzas with exotic and imported ingredients available at specialty restaurants.

Indonesia

In Indonesia, Pizza Hut is the largest pizza chain restaurant, first entering Indonesia in 1984, followed by Domino's Pizza and Papa Ron's Pizza. Popular pizza recipes such as meat lover's with pepperoni, tuna with melted cheese, and beef blackpepper exist in Indonesia. Those recipes originated either from United States or Italy, thus deriving ultimately from a western counterpart.

However, there are also Asian eastern pizzas which includes Indonesian fusion pizza that combine Indonesian favourite as pizza toppings — such as satay, balado and rendang.
 Balado pizza, spicy hot balado chili pepper pizza, chicken or beef.
 Rendang pizza, spicy and savoury beef rendang pizza.
 Satay pizza, beef or chicken satay pizza with peanut sauce.
Other than Indonesian fusion, other Asian fusion pizza are also known in Indonesia, including:
 Tom Yum pizza, Tom Yum flavour pizza from Thailand
 Bulgogi pizza, Bulgogi flavor pizza from South Korea
 Kimchi pizza, Kimchi flavor pizza from South Korea
 Tikka Chicken pizza, Chicken tikka flavour pizza from India
 Peking Duck pizza, Peking duck flavour pizza from China
 Salmon Teriyaki pizza, Teriyaki flavour pizza from Japan

Japan
American pizza chains entered Japan in the 1970s (e.g. Shakey's Pizza and Pizza Hut in 1973, Domino's Pizza in 1985). The largest Japanese pizza chain is Pizza-La. Local types of pizza are popular, with many using mayonnaise sauces, and sometimes other ingredients such as corn, potatoes, avocado, eel, or even honey or chocolate pizza (as a dessert). "Side orders" also often include items such as french fries, fried chicken, and baked pasta, as well as vegetable soups and green salads. There is also a strong tradition of using Tabasco sauce on cooked pizzas.

One of the unique pizza toppings found in Japan is squid. While seafood may be found on pizzas in most markets worldwide to some extent, having squid as the focal ingredient is unique to Japan.

Local crust variants also exist, for instance mochi pizza (crust made with Japanese mochi cakes). Traditional pizza served in Italian-style restaurants is also popular, and the most popular pizza chain promoting Italian style artisanal pizza is Salvatore Cuomo. The Italian association Associazione Verace Pizza Napoletana also has an independent branch in Japan.

Korea
Pizza is a popular snack food in South Korea, especially among younger people. Major American brands such as Domino's, Pizza Hut, and Papa John's Pizza compete against domestic brands such as Mr. Pizza and Pizza Etang, offering traditional as well as local varieties which may include toppings such as bulgogi and dak galbi. Korean-style pizza tends to be complicated, and often has nontraditional toppings such as corn, potato wedges, sweet potato, shrimp, or crab. Traditional Italian-style thin-crust pizza is served in the many Italian restaurants in Seoul and other major cities.

North Korea's first pizzeria opened in its capital Pyongyang in 2009.

Malaysia

Pizza restaurants in Malaysia include Domino's, Pizza Hut, Papa John's, D'italiane, Canadian 2 and 1 pizza, Jom Pizza, US Pizza and Sure Pizza. There have been several small pizza businesses run by locals, especially in night markets.

Nepal
Pizza is becoming more popular as a fast food in the urban areas of Nepal, particularly in the capital city, Kathmandu, which has several restaurants serving pizza. With the opening of international pizza restaurants, pizza's popularity and consumption has markedly increased in recent times. Common pizza types include mushroom pizza, chicken pizza and paneer pizza.

Pakistan
The first pizzerias opened in Karachi and Islamabad in the late 1980s, with Pappasallis serving pizza in Islamabad since 1990. Pizza has gained a measure of popularity in the eastern regions of Pakistan, namely the provinces of Sindh, Punjab, and Azad Kashmir, as well as the autonomous territory of Gilgit-Baltistan. Pizza has not penetrated into western Pakistan; of the remaining provinces and territories of Pakistan, only one (Khyber Pakhtunkhwa) has seen much of the dish, in the form of a single Pizza Hut in Peshawar. Pizza is very popular in the capital of Balochistan, Quetta and there are many shops open to serve customers with varieties such as Supreme pizza and chicken tikka being popular. Chicken Tikka and achari chicken pizzas are popular. In the regions where pizza is known, spicy chicken and sausage-based pizzas are also very popular, as they cater to the local palate.

Philippines

Pizza first arrived in the Philippines during the American period (1901–1946). Many pizza restaurant chains that set up shop in the Philippines (e.g. Shakey's) are American in origin, though a few Filipino brands exist. The common Filipino-style pizza is similar to the Hawaiian pizza except being thinner and sweeter. There are also variants using traditional Filipino dishes like sardines, dried tinapa, bagnet, and longganisa as toppings.

Thailand
The Pizza Company Thailand introduced durian pizza in 2018 to mixed reviews. It bears mention however that Thai-style pizzas, in homage to Thai cuisine, also appear in the US and elsewhere with peanut-based sauces and ingredients like tofu, bean sprouts, shredded carrots, basil or cilantro, shredded green beans, scallions, and similar items.

West Asia

Iran

Israel
Many Israeli and American pizza stores and chains, including Pizza Hut and Sbarro, have both kosher and non-kosher locations. Kosher locations either have no meat or use imitation meat because of the Jewish religious dietary prohibition against mixing meat with dairy products such as cheese. Kosher pizza locations must also close during the holiday of Passover, when no leavened bread is allowed in kosher locations. (However, many have found solutions by offering a potato starch-based dough.) Some Israeli pizza differs from pizza in other countries because of the very large portions of vegetable toppings such as mushrooms or onions, and some unusual toppings, like corn or labane, middle-Eastern spices, such as za'atar, and even boiled eggs. Like most foods in Israel, pizza choices reflect multiple cultures, since people from the former Soviet Union and Europe, plus Israeli-born descendants and Ashkenazi Jews, account for 50% of the Jews in Israel.

Turkey
Pizza establishments in Turkey are a mixture of local restaurants, local chains (e.g. Pizza Max), and international chains like Pizza Hut, Domino's Pizza, Little Caesars, and Sbarro. While most combinations of toppings reflect common ingredients found in Italy, there are additional ingredients available that cater to traditional tastes as well, such as minced beef, spicy Sucuk sausage, cured meats like Pastırma, cheeses like Kaşar and Beyaz, and local olives and herbs. With the exception of some restaurants, pork products like ham and bacon are not available, which are substituted with beef, chicken, or lamb equivalents.

Pizza has several equivalent or similar dishes in traditional Turkish cuisine, such as Black-Sea-style or Bafra-style Pide and Lahmacun, which adds to the popularity of the dish across Turkey.

North America

Canada

Canada has many of its own chains, both national and regional, and many distinctive regional variations and types of pizza resulting from influences of local Canadian cuisine.

Mexico

Pizza in Mexico is made with ingredients typical of Mexican cuisine. The usual toppings that can be found throughout Mexico are chorizo, jalapeño pepper slices, grilled or fried onions, tomato, chili pepper, shrimp, avocado, and sometimes beef, bell peppers, tripas, canned tuna or scallops. This pizza has the usual marinara sauce or white sauce and mozzarella cheese. Variations, substituting pepper jack cheese or Oaxaca cheese for mozzarella, are also popular.

United States

In 1905, the first pizza establishment in the United States was opened in New York's Little Italy. Due to the influx of Italian immigrants, the U.S. has developed regional forms of pizza, some bearing only a casual resemblance to the Italian original. Chicago has its own style of a deep-dish pizza, and New York City's style of pizza is well-known. New York-style pizza refers to the thin crust pizza popular in the states of New York, New Jersey, and Connecticut. Connecticut is also home to New Haven-style pizza, made whole and cooked in an extremely hot coal-fired oven. "Tavern-Style" popular in Chicago and St. Louis, among other Midwestern cities, use thin crusts and rectangular slices in its cracker-like pizzas. Philadelphia provides sauce on top of the cheese; Detroit-style pizza is a square pizza that has a thick deep-dish crisp crust, and is generally served with the sauce on top of the cheese. The square shape is the result of an early tradition of using metal trays originally meant to hold small parts in factories. The jumbo slice is an oversized New York-style pizza sold by the slice to go, especially in the Adams Morgan neighborhood in Washington, D.C. The white clam pie is a pizza variety that originated at the Frank Pepe Pizzeria Napoletana restaurant in New Haven, Connecticut. Barbecue pizza was first made at Coletta's in Memphis, using pulled pork and barbecue sauce, now popular in the Southern United States. In California the barbecue chicken pizza is popular, first invented by Ed LaDou in 1985. The BBQ burnt end pizza can be found in Kansas City.

Taco Bell sells a food item called the Mexican Pizza. It resembles a double decker, open faced tostada. It is relatively unknown in Mexico. The Mexican Pizza is normally made with beef, but its vegetarian variant made with beans has a cult following among South Asian Americans.

Oceania

Australia

The usual Italian varieties are available, though more common is the style popular in the U.S., with more and richer toppings than Italian style. A common unique type is the Aussie, Australian or Australiana, which has the usual tomato base or a seasoned base and mozzarella cheese with options of chicken, ham, bacon and egg (seen as quintessentially Australian breakfast fare). Pizzas with seafood such as prawns are also popular. In the 1980s some Australian pizza shops and restaurants began selling "gourmet pizzas", that is, pizzas with more expensive ingredients such as mangoes, salmon, dill, bocconcini, tiger prawns, or unconventional toppings such as kangaroo meat, emu and crocodile. "Wood-fired pizzas", that is, those cooked in a ceramic oven heated by wood fuel, are well-regarded.

Franchised pizza chains coexist with independent pizzerias. Middle-Eastern bakeries and kebabs shops often sell pizza, which is often done in a Lebanese or Turkish style.

In Australia, barbecue sauce and traditional tomato sauce are both common and popular sauces for pizza bases. White pizza (i.e.: without sauce) is not common.

Fiji
In Fiji, there are many local pizzerias.

There is a local variety of the chicken pizza, originally part of the Indo-Fijian cuisine.

New Zealand
The usual Italian varieties are available and independent restaurants are common, coexisting with franchise chains. New Zealand's first dedicated pizza franchise was opened by Pizza Hut in New Lynn in 1974, with Domino's following. One notable indigenous chain is Hell Pizza established in 1996 – which now has outlets worldwide – distinguishing itself by often-controversial marketing and using only free-range ingredients. Furthermore, Middle-Eastern bakeries and kebabs shops often sell pizza, which is often done in Turkish style.

New Zealand has no rules for pizza construction, leading to an eclectic and varied approach to toppings. Gourmet and "wild" ingredients are often used, and New Zealanders are apt to push the boundaries of what a pizza can be.

In 2017, spaghetti pizza gained media attention when then Prime Minister of New Zealand Bill English posted a recipe to his Facebook account that included tinned spaghetti. The recipe included pineapple as a topping. Responses on social media included support for spaghetti pizza as a simple and cheap family meal. In 2019 Domino's Pizza included a "Hawaiian Spaghetti Pizza" on the menu on its franchises in New Zealand.

South America

Argentina

Argentina, and more specifically Buenos Aires, received a massive Italian migration. At the turn of the 19th century, immigrants from Naples and Genoa opened the first pizza bars, though Spanish-descended residents (particularly of Galician origin – famed for their influence on Latin American empanadas) previously owned many bakeries and subsequently developed most of the pizza businesses.

Standard Argentine pizza has a thicker crust, "media masa" (half dough), than traditional Italian style pizza and includes more cheese. Argentine gastronomy tradition, served pizza with fainá, which is a Genovesi chick pea-flour dough placed over the piece of pizza, and moscato wine. The most popular variety of pizza is called "muzzarela" (mozzarella), similar to Neapolitan pizza (bread, tomato sauce and cheese), but made with a thicker "media masa" crust, triple cheese, tomato sauce and oregano, usually also with olives. It can be found on nearly every corner of the country; Buenos Aires is considered the city with the most pizza bars by person in the world. Other popular toppings include ham (with or without slices of red bell peppers in oil preserve), tomato slices, red bell peppers in preserve, and longaniza. Two Argentine born varieties of pizza, also very popular: fugazza with cheese and fugazzeta. The former one consists in a regular pizza crust topped with cheese and onions; the latter has the cheese between two pizza crusts, with onions on top.

In Argentina, a pizza a la napolitana ("Neapolitan pizza") is a pizza topped with mozzarella cheese and slices of fresh tomato, which may also be flavoured with garlic.

Brazil

In 2007, São Paulo was the second largest consumer of pizza in the world, behind only New York City, with 1.4 million pizzas consumed daily. It also had 6,000 pizza establishments, out of a total of 25,000 in the country.

It is said that the first Brazilian pizzas were baked in the Brás district of São Paulo in the late part of the 19th century. Until the 1940s, pizza was almost only found in the Italian communities around the country. Since then, pizza became increasingly popular among the rest of the population. The most traditional pizzerias are still found in the Italian neighborhoods, such as Bexiga (official name: Bela Vista).

The date 10 July is "Pizza Day" in São Paulo, marking the final day of an annual competition among "pizzaiolos". In São Paulo, almost every local neighborhood pizzeria uses wood-fired brick ovens.

Both Neapolitan (thick crust) and Roman (thin crust) varieties are common in Brazil, with traditional savory versions using tomato sauce and mozzarella as a base. Brazilian pizza in general, though, tends to have less tomato sauce than authentic Italian pizza.

A common ingredient in Brazilian pizza is requeijão (sometimes referred to by the name of a famous brand, "Catupiry"), a creamy and loose white cheese. Common toppings, such as pepperoni or ham, are often offered with requeijão as well – in the case of pepperoni and Catupiry, the combination is sometimes called "catuperoni". Brazil's pizza quattro formaggi, called "quatro queijos", is usually made using mozzarella, requeijão, parmesan and provolone or, sometimes, gorgonzola; some pizzerias offer a variety with all five cheeses.

Calabresa pizza is widely regarded as the most popular pizza in Brazil – calabresa being a Brazilian variant of sausage somewhat similar to pepperoni. Shredded chicken with requeijão ( or frango com Catupiry) is not as popular, but still among the most popular pizza topping choices.

Another common occurrence in Brazilian pizzas is stuffed crust, usually with requeijão or cream cheese in savory pizzas.

Brazil is mostly liberal when it comes to pizza toppings. Apart from ketchup and mustard, commonly added to pizzas by customers and sometimes frowned upon by foreigners, Brazilian pizzas are sometimes very exotic, with choices such as chicken or beef Stroganoff pizza; cheeseburger pizza; French fries pizza; fettuccine pizza; among others.

Sweet pizzas are also very common in Brazil, and usually fall into one of two main categories: chocolate or banana. Chocolate pizzas are more versatile in their ingredients, being topped with chocolate sprinkles to mimic a brigadeiro, M&M's, strawberries or sometimes even brownie chunks. Banana pizzas, on the other hand, are usually covered in sugar and cinnamon, and sometimes have a layer of mozzarella beneath the bananas.

Stuffed crusts are also available for sweet pizzas: they can be stuffed with a variety of chocolates, or even hazelnut and cocoa creams.

Colombia
"Hawaiian pizza" is popular in Colombia. This pizza is topped with ham and pineapple.

Uruguay 

Pizza has been wholly included in Uruguayan cuisine, a country with a significant italian population. Typical Uruguayan pizzas are characterised by their rectangular shape and their cooking method within a clay oven.

Popular varieties include pizza rellena (stuffed pizza), pizza por metro (pizza by the meter), and pizza a la parrilla (grilled pizza). While Uruguayan pizza largely derives from Neapolitan cuisine, yeast-leavened sicilian pizza is common on events such as birthdays or reunions under the name pizza de cumpleaños (birthday pizza). The Uruguayan fugaza (fugazza) comes from the focaccia xeneise (Genoan), but in any case its preparation is different from its Italian counterpart, and the addition of cheese to make the dish (fugaza con queso or fugazzeta) started in Argentina or Uruguay.

Sliced pizza is often served along with fainá, made with chickpea flour and baked in the same oven.

Africa

Algeria
A traditional pizza in Algeria uses a dough made with semolina and flour. On top, the traditional pizza has only tomato sauce, black olives and chopped parsley, which makes it vegan like the pizza marinara in Italy.

See also
 List of pizza chains

References

Further reading
 

Flatbread dishes
Italian cuisine-related lists
+Pizza
Lists of foods by type
Mediterranean cuisine
World cuisine